Moonflesh is a Big Finish Productions audio drama based on the long-running British science fiction television series Doctor Who.

Plot
The Doctor and Nyssa arrive in Suffolk in 1911 and are surprised to find elephants, lions and other non-native wildlife near to the TARDIS. The owner of the estate where they have landed, Nathaniel Whitlock, saves then from a hungry lion and explains that he has had the animals shipped over from other countries to be hunted.

Mr. Whitlock and his daughter extend their hospitality to the Doctor and Nyssa, allowing them to stay the night. A strange crystalline object known as Moonflesh and how it was obtained by a man known only as Silver Crow is a source of the evening's discussion among all of Whitlock's guests. But what is the mysterious Moonflesh, why are some of the animals behaving strangely and can an alien being called Vatuus really be trusted?

Cast
The Doctor – Peter Davison
Nyssa – Sarah Sutton
Nathaniel Whitlock – Tim Bentinck
Phoebe Whitlock – Rosanna Miles
Silver Crow – John Banks
Hannah Bartholemew – Francesca Hunt
Edwin Tremayne – Hugh Fraser
Hector Tremayne – Geoffrey Breton

Notes
Francesca Hunt previously played the character of Georgina Marlowe in the Eighth Doctor adventure Other Lives.
Hugh Fraser has previously played other characters in the Fifth Doctor adventures Circular Time and The Cradle of the Snake.

External links
Moonflesh – Big Finish
Moonflesh review at Kasterborous.com

2014 audio plays
Fifth Doctor audio plays
Fiction set in 1911